The bar-winged wood wren (Henicorhina leucoptera) is a species of bird in the family Troglodytidae. It is found in southern Ecuador and northern Peru.

Taxonomy and systematics

The bar-winged wood wren was originally thought to be closely related to the grey-breasted wood wren (Henicorhina leucophrys) but later DNA studies showed that it is more closely related to the white-breasted wood wren (H. leucosticta). It is monotypic.

Description

The adult's crown is light gray-brown darkening to dusky brown on the upper back. Its lower back and rump are reddish brown. The tail is black with some fine dusky bars. Its folded wing shows two prominent white bars formed by the tips of the coverts. It has a wide white supercilium, a broken white eye ring, a black patch behind the eye, and a black and white streaked cheek. Its chin, throat, and upper breast are off-white mottled with pale gray. The center of the belly is white darkening to pale cinnamon on the lower belly and darker cinnamon in the vent area. The juvenile's underside is dark gray, brown, and cinnamon and it does not show wing bars.

Distribution and habitat

The bar-winged wood wren is found on the east slope of the Andes of southeastern Ecuador and northern Peru. It inhabits the understory of elfin forest, a biome found mostly on separate ridges with poor soils.

Behavior

Feeding

The bar-winged wood wren is known to be insectivorous but no other details of its diet have been published. It forages on and near the ground, making short flights and probing and gleaning vegetation for prey.

Breeding

Virtually nothing is known about the bar-winged wood-wren's breeding phenology. A juvenile was collected in July.

Vocalization

The bar-winged wood wren's song is "a mellow, whistled warbling phrase", often sung as a duet by a pair. Its calls include "a dry tchut" and "a squeaky wink".

Status

The IUCN has assessed the bar-winged wood wren as Least concern. It has a small geographic range and specialized habitat requirements. Nevertheless, it is "'fairly common' in Ecuador [and] 'plentiful' at the type locality in Peru".

References

bar-winged wood wren
Birds of the Ecuadorian Andes
Birds of the Peruvian Andes
bar-winged wood wren
bar-winged wood wren
Taxonomy articles created by Polbot